Velký Šenov is a town in Děčín District in the Ústí nad Labem Region of the Czech Republic. It has about 2,000 inhabitants.

Administrative parts
Villages of Janovka, Knížecí, Leopoldka, Malý Šenov and Staré Hraběcí are administrative parts of Velký Šenov.

Geography
It lies in the salient region of Šluknov Hook on the border with Germany. It is situated in the Lusatian Highlands.

History
The first written mention of Velký Šenov is from 1404.

From 1938 to 1945 it was annexed by Nazi Germany and administered as a part of Reichsgau Sudetenland.

Transport
Velký Šenov lies on a local railway line from Děčín to Rumburk via Germany. The town is served by three stops.

Sights
The landmark of the town is the Church of Saint Bartholomew. It is one of the oldest preserved churches in the area. The original medieval church was replaced by the current Renaissance building in the second half of the 16th century, and was modified in the 1780s.

Twin towns – sister cities

Velký Šenov is twinned with:
 Lwówek Śląski, Poland

References

External links

Populated places in Děčín District
Cities and towns in the Czech Republic